Osteochilus serokan is a species of cyprinid fish endemic to Sumatra.

References

Taxa named by Renny Kurnia Hadiaty
Taxa named by Darrell J. Siebert 
Fish described in 1998
Osteochilus